The Very Best of Cher is the eighth compilation album by American singer-actress Cher, released on April 1, 2003. The album includes many of Cher's most popular songs, such as "If I Could Turn Back Time", "Believe", "Gypsies, Tramps and Thieves" and "Take Me Home". It debuted at number seven on the Billboard 200 albums chart and later reached number four on the issue date of May 17. As of November 2011, the album has sold 2.8 million copies in the United States.

Album information
The Very Best of Cher was released by Warner Bros. Records, MCA, and Geffen Records. The original US edition features 21 tracks, while the various later editions typically feature more songs or different selections.

The album originally coincided with the Living Proof: The Farewell Tour. The album cover picture is also seen on the DVD The Farewell Tour and was originally planned to be the DVD cover of The Very Best of Cher: The Video Hits Collection as well, but was changed at the last minute.

Track listing

Notes
"Believe" features writing contribution by Cher who remains uncredited.

Personnel

 Producers: Sonny Bono, Peter Asher, Michael Bolton, Desmond Child, Bob Esty, Snuff Garrett, Steve Lipson, Giorgio Moroder, Brian Rawling, Guy Roche, Bob Rock, Mark Taylor, Diane Warren, Richie Zito
 Executive producer: Cher
 Compilation producer: David MacLees
 Remastering: Bill Inglot, Dan Hersch
 Remixing: Junior Vasquez
 Editorial supervision: Sheryl Farber
 Annotation: Steve Woolard
 Art direction: Jeri Heiden
 Art direction: Hugh Brown
 Design: Barrie Goshko
 Photography: Sonny Bono
 Photography: Norman Seeff
 Photography: Harry Langdon
 Photography: Kevyn Aucoin
 Project assistant: Leigh Hall
 Project assistant: April Milek
 Project assistant: Randy Perry
 Project assistant: Tim Scanlin
 Liner notes: Kurt Loder

Charts

Weekly charts

Year-end charts

Certifications and sales

Release history

References

2003 greatest hits albums
Cher compilation albums
Warner Records compilation albums